The Centre Party is an informal political party in the Pacific nation of Nauru.

Foundation
The party was formed by the former President of Nauru, Kinza Clodumar, and supported René Harris, Clodumar's ally, in the Parliament, mainly in votes of no confidence for or against Harris.

Political role
The CP just has a little role in the Nauruan Parliament and in the political life in Nauru. The party has had at least one seat in the Parliament from 1997 to 2003 (Clodumar), but lost it after the general elections on October 23, 2004.

See also
 Politics of Nauru
 Kinza Clodumar#Post-Presidency and political role

Political parties in Nauru